Steven Scarborough (born June 23, 1953) is an American gay pornographic film director, the founder of Hot House Entertainment (1993), and he was an Executive Vice-President and director for Falcon Studios from 1987 to 1993.

Career 
In 1974, Scarborough came to San Francisco. He opened up a health food store on Castro Street opposite Harvey Milk's camera shop. He later met Dick Fisk (a local sales clerk), who was also a porn star in The Other Side of Aspen (1977), a very successful Falcon Studios gay pornographic film. Then he was introduced to Chuck Holmes, they soon became friends.

Scarborough debuted as a director in the summer of 1988 with the Falcon Studios Perfect Summer at the behest of his life partner Chuck Holmes. Scarborough established that the studio would refrain from condom-less films in support of the safe sex condom-use philosophy.

Awards
Scarborough was inducted into the GayVN Hall Of Fame in 2002.

 1996 Gay Erotic Video Award  Best Special Interest Video - Call To Arms
 1999 "Grabby" Award  Best Fetish Video - Batter Up!
 2001 Free Speech Coalition - Lifetime Achievement Award - Steven Scarborough
 2002 GayVN Award  Hall of Fame Inductee - Steven Scarborough
 2004 GayVN Award  Best Speciality Tape - Mo' Bubble Butt
 2004 GayVN Award  Best Leather Video - Skuff II
 2004 "Grabby" Award  Hall of Fame Inductee - Steven Scarborough
 2005 "Grabby" Award  Best Classic Release - The Road To Hopeful
 2005 "Grabby" Award  Best Duo Sex Scene - Tag Adams and Aiden Shaw in Perfect Fit
 2005 FICEB "HeatGay" Award - Best Gay Picture (Skuff 3)
 2006 GayVN Award  Best Leather Video - The Missing
 2006 "Grabby" Award  Best Fetish Video - Twisted
 2006 "Grabby" Award  Best Leather Video - The Missing
 2006 "Grabby" Award  Hottest Cum Scene - Marco Paris in The Missing
 2006 Maleflixxx Gold VOD Award  Top 10 VOD - Justice
 2006 Maleflixxx Gold VOD Award  Top 10 VOD - Trunks 2
 2006 Hard Choice Awards  Best Director - Steven Scarborough for Justice, Black -N- Blue & Trunks 2
 2006 FICEB "HeatGay" Award - Best Director (The Missing - Hot House Entertainment)
 2007 GayVN Award  Best Leather Video - Black -N- Blue
 2007 GayVN Award  Best All-Sex Video - Black -N- Blue
 2007 GayVN Award  Best Oral Scene - Ty Hudson and Shane Rollins in Justice
 2007 "Grabby" Award  Best Director - Steven Scarborough for Justice
 2007 "Grabby" Award  Best Video - Justice
 2007 "Grabby" Award  Best Actor - Shane Rollins in Justice
 2007 "Grabby" Award  Best Leather Video - Black -N- Blue
 2007 "Grabby" Award  Best Solo Sex Scene - Kent North in At Your Service
 2007 "Grabby" Award  Best Duo Sex Scene - Shane Rollins and Trevor Knight in Justice
 2007 "Grabby" Award  Best Versatile Performer - Hot House Exclusive Francesco D'Macho
 2007 "Grabby" Award  Maleflixxx People's Choice Award - Justice
 2007 David Award  Best American Performer - Hot House Exclusive Trunks 3, Full Throttle, Communion and Jockstrap!
 2007 Maleflixxx Gold VOD Award  Top 10 VOD - Butch Alley
 2007 Maleflixxx Gold VOD Award  Top 10 VOD - Private Lowlife
 2008 CyberSocket Award  Best Video Company Website - HotHouse.com
 2008 XBIZ Award  GLBT Lifetime Achievement Award - Steven Scarborough
 2008 European Gay Porn Awards  Best Non-European Movie - Communion
 2008 European Gay Porn Awards  Best Non-European Studio - Hot House Entertainment
 2008 "Grabby" Award  Best Leather Video - Verboten Parts 1 & 2
 2008 "Grabby" Award  Best Art Direction - Verboten Parts 1 & 2
 2008 "Grabby" Award  Best Cum Scene - Francesco D’Macho and Romario Faria in Verboten Part 2
 2008 "Grabby" Award  Wall of Fame Inductee - Brent Smith
 2008 "Grabby" Award  Wall of Fame Inductee - Hot House Lifetime Exclusive Kent North
 2009 CyberSocket Award  Best Video Company Website - HotHouse.com
 2009 GayVN Award  Best Leather Video - Verboten Parts 1 & 2
 2009 GayVN Award  Best Sex Comedy Video - Paging Dr. Finger
 2009 "Grabby" Award  Lifetime Achievement Award - Steven Scarborough
 2009 "Grabby" Award  Best Newcomer - Kyle King
 2009 "Grabby" Award  Best Sex Comedy - Paging Dr. Finger
 2009 "Grabby" Award  Maleflixxx People's Choice Award - Jockstrap
 2010 XBIZ Award Gay Movie Director of the Year

See also
 List of male performers in gay porn films

References

External links
 

American pornographic film directors
1953 births
Directors of gay pornographic films
Living people